Grădiștea is a commune located in Brăila County, Muntenia, Romania. It is composed of three villages: Grădiștea, Ibrianu and Maraloiu.

References

Communes in Brăila County
Localities in Muntenia